Jach'a Ch'utu (Aymara jach'a big, ch'utu peak of a mountain, top of the head, "big peak", also spelled Jacha Chuto, Jachcha Chuto) is a  mountain in the Bolivian Andes. It is located in the Cochabamba Department, Tapacari Province. Jach'a Ch'utu lies southeast of Siwinqani and Turu Qullu.

References 

Mountains of Cochabamba Department